Sajjadiyeh (also Romanized as Sajjādīyeh) is a village in Elhayi Rural District, in the Central District of Ahvaz County, Khuzestan Province, Iran. At the 2006 census, its population was 124, in 27 families.

References 

Populated places in Ahvaz County